James Underwood may refer to:
 James Underwood (pathologist), British pathologist
 James Underwood (businessman), shipwright, businessman and distiller in Australia
 James H. Underwood, American farmer and politician from New York
 Jim Underwood (professor), professor of management
 Jim Underwood (politician), Guamanian politician